Gee Baby, Ain't I Good to You is an album by trumpeter Harry "Sweets" Edison which was recorded in 1957 and released on the Verve label.

Track listing 
All compositions by Harry Edison except where noted.
 "Blues for Piney Brown" – 7:33
 "Blues for the Blues" – 4:48
 "Blues for Bill Basie" – 9:27
 "Gee, Baby, Ain't I Good to You" (Don Redman, Andy Razaf) – 3:28
 "You're Getting to Be a Habit with Me" (Al Dubin, Harry Warren) – 6:49
 "Taste on the Place" – 6:55
 "Moonlight in Vermont" (Karl Suessdorf, John Blackburn) – 3:52

Personnel 
Harry Edison – trumpet
Ben Webster – tenor saxophone
Oscar Peterson – piano
Herb Ellis (tracks 3, 6 & 7), Barney Kessel (tracks 1, 2, 4 & 5) – guitar
Ray Brown – bass
Alvin Stoller – drums

References 

1957 albums
Harry Edison albums
Verve Records albums
Albums produced by Norman Granz